Rupert of Hee Haw is a 1924 American silent film starring Stan Laurel and drawing on the Ruritanian romance of Rupert of Hentzau, Anthony Hope's sequel to The Prisoner of Zenda.

Plot

In some European castle the King (Stan) is getting royally drunk. His guests, mainly in Prussian style uniforms, await downstairs but he struggles to get down. When the cuckoo clock sounds he shoots it. The King wants more drink. The princess says he needs a punch on the nose. She sends a message to Rudolph, an American style gent who looks just like the King. He tells Princess Minnie that Count Aspirin intercepted her letter. Count Aspirin arrives but he knows Rupert is not the King because he is not drunk. The missing letter gets grabbed from one person to the next.

Outside Rupert is cheered by a small group of children who thinks he is the King. As he bends to talk to a small girl a boy kicks his backside so he goes back inside. Rupert goes to his "mountain house in London". Rupert and Rudolph have a sword duel as Lady Pott Dome lazes and eats chocolates. Princess Minnie arrives and gives Rudolph a note: "I never want to see you again" she leaves with Count Bromo.

Cast
 Stan Laurel - The King/Rudolph Razz
 James Finlayson - Rupert of Hee Haw
 Mae Laurel - The Princess Minnie Hee Haw
 Billy Engle - Short officer
 Ena Gregory - Hee Haw's maid
 Sammy Brooks - Palace guard
 Pierre Couderc - The Duke of Aspirin
 George Rowe - The Duke of Bromo

See also
 List of American films of 1924

References

External links

1924 films
American silent short films
American black-and-white films
1924 comedy films
1924 short films
Films directed by Scott Pembroke
Silent American comedy films
American comedy short films
American parody films
1920s American films